In enzymology, a preQ1 synthase is an enzyme that catalyzes the chemical reaction

7-aminomethyl-7-carbaguanine + 2 NADP+  7-cyano-7-carbaguanine + 2 NADPH + 2 H+

Thus, the two substrates of this enzyme are 7-aminomethyl-7-carbaguanine and NADP+, whereas its 3 products are 7-cyano-7-carbaguanine, NADPH, and H+.

This enzyme belongs to the family of oxidoreductases, specifically those acting on other nitrogenous compounds as donors with NAD+ or NADP+ as acceptor.  The systematic name of this enzyme class is 7-aminomethyl-7-carbaguanine:NADP+ oxidoreductase. Other names in common use include YkvM, QueF, preQ0 reductase, preQ0 oxidoreductase, 7-cyano-7-deazaguanine reductase, 7-aminomethyl-7-carbaguanine:NADP+ oxidoreductase, queuine synthase (incorrect as queuine is not the product), and queuine:NADP+ oxidoreductase (incorrect as queuine is not the product).

References

 
 
 
 
 
 
 

EC 1.7.1
NADPH-dependent enzymes
Enzymes of unknown structure